Christmas is an EP by Australian singer–songwriter Delta Goodrem, released on December 14, 2012 by Sony Music Australia. It is her first collection of Christmas music, after previously contributing several Christmas recordings to The Spirit of Christmas album series.

Promotion
A lyric video for the track "Blue Christmas", which is also featured on The Spirit of Christmas 2012, was released on December 17, 2012. Goodrem performed "Blue Christmas" and "Amazing Grace" from the EP at the 2012 Carols by Candlelight event on Christmas Eve.

Track listing

Other recordings
The following Christmas tracks were not released on the album, but were released previously.

Charts
The EP debuted at number 67 on the ARIA singles chart, selling 2399 copies in its first week.

Release history

Personnel
Delta Goodrem — vocals, piano, producer
Michael Dolce — guitars
Emile Nelson — double bass
Vince Pizzinga — cello, strings, co-producer
Adam Sofo — piano, keyboards
Simon Todkill — recording, mixing
Warren Trout — drums, percussion
Leon Zervos — mastering

References

2012 debut EPs
Delta Goodrem albums
Sony Music EPs
2012 Christmas albums
Christmas albums by Australian artists
Christmas EPs